José Antonio Urquizo Maggia (born February 13, 1967) is a Peruvian politician (PNP). He served as a Congressman representing Ayacucho from 2006 to 2016.

Education 
From 1984 to 1989, José Antonio Urquizo studied cooperativism and university teaching at the Universidad Nacional Federico Villarreal (UNFV) in Lima, which he concluded with a master's degree. Since 1991, he has been a lecturer at his alma mater. From 1995 to 1995, he led a higher technological institute in Ayacucho. From 1999 to 2000, he took a specialization course in administration at the UNFV.

Political career

Early political career 
In the 2002 regional elections, Urquizo was elected vice governor of the Ayacucho Region, for a four-year term, under the social-democratic Peruvian Aprista Party.

Congressional career 
In the 2006 elections, he was elected to the Congress to represent his home region, on the joint Peruvian Nationalist Party-Union for Peru list. After the split of the alliance, he sat on the Nationalist bench. In the 2011 elections, he was re-elected on the Peru Wins list. In December 2011, after Salomón Lerner resigned as Prime Minister of Peru, Ollanta Humala appointed him as Minister of Production. Afterwards in 2012 he briefly served as Minister of Defense after the resignation of Luis Alberto Otárola and was replaced by Pedro Cateriano in July 2012.

Post-congressional career 
In the 2018 regional elections, he ran for Governor of Ayacucho, but lost, placing third.

External links

 Official Congressional site
 Resume on the National Jury of Elections (JNE) site

1967 births
Living people
People from Ayacucho
Peruvian people of Basque descent
Peruvian Nationalist Party politicians
American Popular Revolutionary Alliance politicians
Members of the Congress of the Republic of Peru
Federico Villarreal National University alumni
Defense ministers of Peru
Academic staff of Federico Villarreal National University
21st-century Peruvian politicians

Union for Peru politicians
People from Ayacucho Region